This article details Crewe Alexandra's 2008–09 season in League One, their 85th competitive season in the English Football League.

Events
This will be a list of the significant events to occur at the club during the 2008–09 season, presented in chronological order.

9 August 2009- season begins with a 2–1 loss at home to Brighton. 
26 August 2009- Crewe progress into the third round of the League Cup with wins over Barnsley and then Bristol City, and are drawn to face Liverpool at Anfield.

Statistics

Players

Squad information

Appearances (starts and substitute appearances) and goals include those in the League One (and playoffs), FA Cup, League Cup and Football League Trophy.

Squad stats

Disciplinary record

Awards

Individual

Club

Players in and out

In

Out

Club

Coaching staff

Kits

Competitions

League One

Table

Results summary

Results by round

Results

Last updated: 16 May 2009

League Cup

FA Cup

Football League Trophy

References

External links
 Official Website
 Sky Sports
 BBC Football

Crewe Alexandra F.C. seasons
Crewe Alexandra